Constance Campbell Bennett (October 22, 1904 – July 24, 1965) was an American stage, film, radio, and television actress and producer. She was a major Hollywood star during the 1920s and 1930s; during the early 1930s, she was the highest-paid actress in Hollywood. Bennett frequently played society women, focusing on melodramas in the early 1930s and then taking more comedic roles in the late 1930s and 1940s. She is best remembered for her leading roles in What Price Hollywood? (1932), Bed of Roses (1933), Topper (1937), Topper Takes a Trip (1938), and had a prominent supporting role in Greta Garbo's last film, Two-Faced Woman (1941). 

She was the daughter of stage and silent film star Richard Bennett, and the older sister of actress Joan Bennett.

Early life

Bennett was born in New York City, the eldest of three daughters of actress Adrienne Morrison and actor Richard Bennett. Her younger sisters were actresses Joan Bennett and Barbara Bennett. All three girls attended the Chapin School in New York.

Career
After some time spent in a convent, Bennett entered acting. Independent, cultured, ironic, and outspoken, Constance, the first Bennett sister to enter motion pictures, appeared in New York-produced silent movies before a meeting with Samuel Goldwyn led to her Hollywood debut in Cytherea (1924). She abandoned a burgeoning career in silent films for marriage to Philip Plant in 1925 but resumed her film career after their divorce in 1929. With the advent of talking pictures and her delicate blonde features and glamor, she quickly revived her career.

In the early 1930s, Bennett was frequently among the top actresses named in audience popularity and box-office polls. In 1931, a short-lived contract with Metro-Goldwyn-Mayer earned her $300,000 for two movies which included The Easiest Way and made her one of the highest-paid stars in Hollywood. Warner Brothers paid her the all-time high salary of $30,000 a week for Bought! in 1931. Richard Bennett, her father, was also cast in this film.

The next year she moved to RKO, where she acted in What Price Hollywood? (1932), directed by George Cukor, an ironic and at the same time tragic behind-the-scenes looks at the Hollywood studio system, in which she portrayed waitress Mary Evans, who becomes a movie star. Lowell Sherman co-starred as the film director who discovers her, and Neil Hamilton as the wealthy playboy she marries who later divorces her. The film Morning Glory had been written with Bennett in mind for the lead role, but producer Pandro S. Berman gave the role to Katharine Hepburn, who won an Academy Award for her performance.

During her time at RKO, Bennett briefly became the highest-paid actress in Hollywood. RKO controlled the careers of actresses Ann Harding and Helen Twelvetrees in a similar manner, hoping to duplicate Bennett's success. 

Bennett next showed her versatility in the likes of Our Betters (1933), writer/director Gregory La Cava's  Bed of Roses (1933) with Pert Kelton, After Tonight (1933, co-starring with future husband Gilbert Roland), The Affairs of Cellini (1934), After Office Hours (1935) with Clark Gable, Topper (1937, as Marian Kerby opposite Cary Grant, a role she repeated in the 1939 sequel, Topper Takes a Trip), the madcap family comedy Merrily We Live (1938) and Two-Faced Woman (1941, supporting Greta Garbo).

By the 1940s, Bennett was working less frequently in film but was in demand in both radio and theatre. She had her own program, Constance Bennett Calls on You, on ABC radio in 1945–1946. Shrewd investments had made her a wealthy woman, and she founded a cosmetics and clothing company. In 1945–1946, she hosted The Constance Bennett Show on ABC Radio.

She had a major supporting role in The Unsuspected (1947), in which she played Jane Moynihan, the program director who helps prove that radio host Victor Grandison (Claude Rains) is guilty of murder. In the 1950s, As Young as You Feel (1951), found her playing opposite Marilyn Monroe. Bennett played herself in a cameo in It Should Happen to You (1954). In 1957–1958, she toured the United States in the title role of Auntie Mame. Bennett made her final screen appearance in the 1965 film Madame X (released posthumously in 1966), as the blackmailing mother-in-law.

Personal life

Bennett was married five times and had three children.

Chester Hirst Moorehead
On June 15, 1921, Bennett eloped with Chester Hirst Moorehead of Chicago, a student at the University of Virginia who was the son of oral surgeon, Frederick Moorehead. They were married by a justice of the peace in Greenwich, Connecticut. Bennett was 16 at the time. A New York Times article reporting the elopement observed: "The parents of Miss Bennett were opposed to their marriage at this time solely on account of their youth." The marriage was annulled in 1923.

Philip Morgan Plant
Bennett's next serious relationship was with millionaire socialite Philip Morgan Plant. Her parents planned a cruise to Europe, taking Constance with them, to separate the couple. As the ship was preparing to leave port, however, the Bennetts saw Plant and his parents boarding, too. A contemporary newspaper article reported, "Now the little beauty and the heir to all the Plant millions were assured a week of the cosy intimacy which an ocean liner affords." In November 1925, the two eloped and were married in Greenwich, Connecticut, by the same justice of the peace who officiated at Bennett's wedding to Moorehead. They divorced in a French court in 1929. 

In 1932, Bennett returned from Europe with a three-year-old child, whom she claimed to have adopted and named Peter Bennett Plant (born 1929). In 1942, however, during a battle over a large trust fund established to benefit any descendants of her former husband, Bennett announced that her adopted son actually was her natural child by Plant, born after the divorce and kept hidden to ensure that the child's biological father did not get custody. During the court hearings, the actress told her former mother-in-law and her husband's widow that "if she got to the witness stand she would give a complete account of her life with Plant." The matter was settled out of court.

Henri de la Falaise
In 1931, Bennett made headlines when she married one of Gloria Swanson's former husbands, Henri le Bailly, the Marquis de La Coudraye de La Falaise, a French nobleman and film director. She and de la Falaise founded Bennett Pictures Corp. and co-produced two films which were the Hollywood films shot in the two-strip Technicolor process, Legong: Dance of the Virgins (1935) filmed on location in Bali, and Kilou the Killer Tiger (1936), filmed in Indochina. The couple divorced in Reno, Nevada in 1940.

Gilbert Roland and John Theron Coulter
Bennett's fourth marriage was to actor Gilbert Roland. They were married in 1941 and had two daughters, Lorinda "Lynda" and Christina "Gyl". They divorced in 1946, with Bennett winning custody of their children. Later that year, Bennett married for the fifth and final time to US Air Force Colonel John Theron Coulter. After her marriage, she concentrated her efforts on providing relief entertainment to US troops still stationed in Europe, winning military honors for her services. Bennett and Coulter remained married for the rest of her life. Bennett supported Barry Goldwater in the 1964 United States presidential election.

On July 24, 1965, shortly after filming of Madame X was completed, Bennett collapsed and died from a cerebral hemorrhage at the age of 60. In recognition of her military contributions, and as the wife of John Theron Coulter, who had achieved the rank of brigadier general, she was buried in Arlington National Cemetery. Coulter died in 1995 and was buried with her.

Legacy
Bennett has a motion pictures star on the Hollywood Walk of Fame for her contributions to the film industry. Her star is located at 6250 Hollywood Boulevard, a short distance from the star of her sister, Joan.

Filmography

Notes

References

External links

 Constance Bennett Website
 
 
 
 
Arlington National Cemetery
 Constance Bennett Photo Gallery
 Photographs and literature

1904 births
1965 deaths
American people of English descent
American people of Jewish descent
American people of Spanish descent
American stage actresses
American film actresses
American silent film actresses
American radio actresses
Actresses from New York City
20th-century American actresses
Burials at Arlington National Cemetery
Chapin School (Manhattan) alumni